AMK Hub (abbreviation for Ang Mo Kio Hub) is a suburban shopping mall located in Ang Mo Kio, within the North-East Region of Singapore. It is connected to Ang Mo Kio Bus Interchange which is linked to Ang Mo Kio MRT station via an underpass.

History
Built on the former site of the old Ang Mo Kio Bus Interchange and the Oriental Emporium (Block 701), the original AMK Hub was intended to be a mixed used development consisting of a residential development and an office tower with the new Ang Mo Kio Bus Interchange on the ground level, set to be completed in 2004. However, shortly after demolition works to the old Ang Mo Kio Bus Interchange, the old contractor went bust, thus the site remained abandoned for two years. Meanwhile, the Singapore Labour Foundation (the then owner of AMK Hub) made changes to the proposed development, from a mixed used development to a small shopping complex, which will host a hypermarket, a new air-conditioned bus interchange, an 8-screen cinema, and more than 100 specialty shops. The mall opened in phases from December 2006 and was officially opened in July 2007 by Prime Minister Lee Hsien Loong.

References

External links
 

Shopping malls in Singapore
Shopping malls established in 2007
Buildings and structures in Ang Mo Kio
2007 establishments in Singapore